Mills Lake is a lake in Blue Earth County, Minnesota, in the United States.

Mills Lake was named for Titus Mills, an early settler whose farm was near this lake.

See also
List of lakes in Minnesota

References

Lakes of Minnesota
Lakes of Blue Earth County, Minnesota